Key of Soul is a live album by McCoy Tyner released on the Japanese Alfa label. It was recorded in June 1991 at Sweet Basil in New York City and features a live performance by Tyner with bassist Avery Sharpe and drummer Aaron Scott. Another album of this evening's concert was released as Solar: Live at Sweet Basil (1991).

Track listing 
 "I Wanna Stand over There" (Hutcherson) -    
 "Suddenly" -     
 "I Should Care" (Cahn, Stordahl, Weston) -    
 "Miss Bea" -   
All compositions by McCoy Tyner except as indicated
Recorded at Sweet Basil, New York, New York on June 14, 1991

Personnel 
 McCoy Tyner - piano
 Avery Sharpe - bass
 Aaron Scott - drums

References 

1992 live albums
McCoy Tyner live albums